The 1983 Chagos Archipelago earthquake occurred on November 30 at 17:46 UTC (23:46 local time) in the region of the Chagos Archipelago, British Indian Ocean Territory. This earthquake had a moment magnitude and surface wave magnitude of 7.7. This earthquake occurred in the Indian Plate near the Central Indian Ridge. The Central Indian Ridge is unusually active in near-ridge earthquakes. The intense seismic activity in this region may indicate an early stage of converging plate boundary, which is responsible for the N-S extension near Chagos. There was a 40 cm tsunami reported in Victoria, Seychelles.

References

External links 

Earthquakes in Asia
Chagos Archipelago Earthquake, 1983
Chagos Archipelago
1983 tsunamis
1983 in Seychelles